Resistance is a 2003 Dutch/American World War II film, directed by Todd Komarnicki and starring Bill Paxton, Julia Ormond, Philippe Volter, Sandrine Bonnaire, and Victor Reinier. It was written by Komarnicki and Anita Shreve, based on Shreve's 1995 novel of the same name. Resistance, with a 16 million euro budget, was the most expensive Dutch production ever. Its theatrical run lasted for just one week.

Plot
On 16 January 1944, a reconnaissance pilot survives a plane crash in Delahaut in German-occupied Belgium. The boy Jean Benoit finds the wounded pilot and takes him to the house of Claire and Henri Daussois who belong to the Belgian Resistance. As soon as Major Theodore 'Ted' Brice has recovered, he tells them that he needs to retrieve a book of codes, but the airplane is guarded by the Nazis. Meanwhile, Ted and Claire fall in love with each other. When three German guards that are protecting the debris of the airplane are executed, the Nazis select a group of villagers and hang them in a barn. When Henri finds that Ted and Claire are having a love affair, he betrays the pilot with tragic consequences.

Cast
 Bill Paxton as Ted Brice
 Julia Ormond as Claire Daussois
 Philippe Volter as Henri Daussois
 Sandrine Bonnaire as Lucette Oomlop
 Jean-Michel Vovk as Anthoine
 Antoine Van Lierde as Jean Benoit
 Ariane Schluter as Beatrice Benoit
 Angelo Bison as Artaud Benoit
 Filip Peeters as Captain Haas
 Victor Reinier as The Interrogator
 Dennis Hayden as Eddie

References

External links
 
 

2003 films
2003 drama films
Films about shot-down aviators
Films about the Belgian Resistance
American war drama films
2000s English-language films
2000s American films